{{Infobox Identity document
|document_name = Indian Passport
|image = Indian Passport.svg
|image_caption = The front cover of a new Indian passport (2021).
| date_first_issued   = 1920 (first version)  2021 (latest version Biometric Machine Readable Passport)

2023 (tentative;  e-Passport)
|using_jurisdiction = Ministry of External Affairs
|valid_jurisdictions = All countries
|document_type = Passport
|purpose = Identification
|eligibility = Indian citizenship
|expiration = 10 years (Adult) 5 or 10 years (age 15 to 18) 5 years (Minor)
|cost =Adult (36 pages): ₹1,500Adult (60 pages): ₹2,000Minor (36 pages): ₹1,000
Note: If the application for a new passport is made under the Tatkaal (expedited processing), the additional Tatkaal fee of ₹2,000 is to be paid in addition to the regular application fee.
}}

An Indian passport is a passport issued by the Ministry of External Affairs of the Republic of India to Indian citizens for the purpose of international travel. It enables the bearer to travel internationally and serves as proof of Indian citizenship as per the Passports Act (1967). The Passport Seva (Passport Service) unit of the Consular, Passport & Visa (CPV) Division of the Ministry of External Affairs functions as the issuing authority and is responsible for issuing Indian passports on application to all eligible Indian citizens. Indian passports are issued at 93 passport offices located across India and at 197 Indian diplomatic missions abroad.

In 2015, India issued about 12 million passports, ranking third only after China and the United States of America. Approximately 65 million Indians held valid passports .

As of 12 December 2022, only 7.2 percent (approximately 96 million) of Indian citizens possessed a valid passport, with Kerala having the highest number of passport holders of all Indian states. Previously, passports were not popular among the masses due to a time consuming and complicated process and limited access to the passport facilitation centres located only in major cities. With the expansion of centres and technological improvements, accompanied by increased outsourcing of professionals and an expanding middle-class, the percentage is expected to go up.

History

British Raj
British Indian passports were issued to British subjects of the British Indian Empire, as well as to British subjects from other parts of the British Empire, and subjects of the British protected states in India (i.e. British protected persons of the 'princely states'). These passports were introduced in British India after the First World War. The Indian Passport Act of 1920 required the use of passports, established controls on the foreign travel of Indians, and foreigners travelling to and within India. The passport was based on the format agreed upon by the 1920 League of Nations International Conference on Passports. However, the British Indian passport had very limited usage, being valid for travel only within the British Empire, Italy, Switzerland, Austria, Czechoslovakia, Germany, France, Spain, Norway, Sweden and Holland.

Dominion of India
The use of the passport was discontinued after the establishment of the dominions of India and Pakistan in 1947, and its bearers were entitled to opt for Indian, Pakistani or British nationality.

Passport laws were made strict in both the countries in 1952.  Initially, Indian passports were granted only to "respectable" people. A literacy test was required, and passports were denied to Communist Party of India members. Only in 1967 did the Supreme Court rule that every citizen had the right to a passport.

Types of passport

  Ordinary Passport (Dark Blue cover) is issued to ordinary citizens for private travel, such as for vacation, study and business trips (36 or 60 pages). It is a "Type P" passport, where P stands for Personal.
  Official Passport (White cover) is issued to individuals representing the Government of India on official business, including members of the Indian Armed Forces stationed abroad. It is a "Type S" passport, S stands for Service. Since 2021, all Official Passports issued have been ePassports, with a data chip embedded into the document.
  Diplomatic Passport (Maroon cover) is issued to Indian diplomats, Members of Parliament, members of the Union Council of Ministers, certain high-ranking government officials and diplomatic couriers, as well as their dependants. Upon request, it may also be issued to high-ranking state-level officials travelling on official business. It is a "Type D" passport, with D standing for Diplomatic. Since 2008, all Diplomatic Passports have been ePassports, with a data chip embedded into the document. Many visa requirements normally applied to Indian citizens are waived for Diplomatic Passport holders.

In addition, selected passport offices in India as well as overseas missions were authorised to issue regular India-Bangladesh Passport to Indian nationals resident in West Bengal and the North-Eastern States, India-Sri Lanka Passport to Indian nationals resident in Tamil Nadu and Puducherry and the India-Pakistan Passport to Indian nationals whose ancestral homes lay on the other side of the Radcliffe Line. These three passports respectively permitted travel to Bangladesh, Sri Lanka and Pakistan only and were not valid for travel to other foreign countries. Both India and Bangladesh stopped issuing the Indo-Bangladesh Passport in 2013 due to changes in ICAO regulations.

Tatkaal and SVPTatkaal Passports (for urgent needs), and Short Validity Passport (SVP) are also available and these are likely considered Ordinary Passports'' once issued.

e-Passports

The need for e-Passports (or Biometric passport) in India was realised in the late 2010s. Till early 2022, the government issued 20,000 official and diplomatic e-passports, but not to ordinary citizens of India. The government had issued the first e-passport to former President of India, Pratibha Patil in 2008.

The Union government officially announced to roll out e-passports on the lines of international standards for Indian citizens in the 2022-23 fiscal year. The Union Finance Minister Nirmala Sitharaman announced the same during the Union Budget 2022 address to the Loksabha. ICAO compliant passports with embedded electronic chip and digital inlays have been aimed for speedy immigration checks and high security. For the roll out of e-Passports, the Ministry of External Affairs entered into a contract with the Tata Consultancy Services. This has been officially termed as Passport Seva Programme V2.0.

Physical appearance

Early passports dating back to the British Empire were handwritten; in addition, more than a hundred thousand handwritten passports were issued between 1997 and 2000 with 20-year validity dates. These passports have been ruled invalid by the Indian government and holders must replace them with machine-readable versions with validity for 10 years due to ICAO regulations.

Versions prior to 2021 had deep bluish cover with golden coloured printing. The Emblem of India emblazoned in the center of the front cover. The words भारत गणराज्य in Devanagari and REPUBLIC OF INDIA were inscribed below the Emblem whereas पासपोर्ट in Devanagari and PASSPORT in English were inscribed above the emblem.

The latest version of 2021 has the official name of the country and "Passport" engravings' positions changed mutually. The passport has the passport number perforated. The pages have been re-designed.

The standard passport contains 36 pages, but frequent travellers can opt for a passport containing 60 pages.

Identity Information Page

 The Bio data page contains the following information:
 Type: P- Stands for "Personal",  if it's a Diplomatic or Service passport then it listed as "D" or "S"
 Code: (listed as IND for "India")
 Nationality: Indian
 Passport number 
 Surname
 Given name(s)
 Date of birth 
 Sex
 Place of birth 
 Place of issue 
 Date of issue 
 Date of expiry
 Photo of passport holder
 Ghost picture of the passport holder (only passports issued since 2013)
 Signature of the passport holder
The information page ends with the Machine Readable Passport Zone (MRZ).
 The Demographics page at the end of the passport book contains the following information:
 Name of father or legal guardian 
 Name of mother 
 Name of spouse
 Address
 Old passport no. with date and place of issue 
 File number

Passport note
All passports contain a note in Hindi and English, nominally from the President of India, addressing the authorities of all countries and territories:

The note bearing page is typically stamped and signed by the issuing authority in the name of the President of the Republic of India.

Languages
The text of Indian Passport is printed in Hindi and English, two of the twenty two scheduled official languages (as per Eighth Schedule to the Constitution of India) at the Union level.

Emigration check

Holders of Emigration Check Required (ECR) type passports need a clearance called an Emigration Check from the Government of India's Protector of Emigrants when going to selected countries on a work visa. This is to prevent the exploitation of Indian workers (especially the unskilled and less-educated) when going abroad, particularly to Middle Eastern countries. ECR type passport holders travelling on a tourist visa do not need a clearance; this is known as an Emigration Check Suspension.

Emigration Check Not Required (ECNR) status passports are granted to:
 Indian nationals born abroad;
 Indian nationals holding at least a matriculation certificate;
 All holders of diplomatic or official passports.
 All gazetted government servants;
 All income-tax payers (including agricultural income-tax payers) in their individual capacity;
 All graduate and professional degree holders (such as architects, doctors, engineers, chartered accountants, scientists, lawyers, etc.);
 Spouses and dependent children of category of certain holders of ECNR passports;
 Seamen in possession of a continuous discharge certificate;
 Sea Cadets and Deck Cadets who have:
 Passed their final examination on a three-year BSc Nautical Sciences Course at TS Chanakya, Mumbai; and
 Undergone three months' pre-sea training at any of the government-approved training institutes such as TS Chanakya, TS Jawahar, TS Rehman, Maritime Training Institute (SCI), or National Institute of Personnel Management, Chennai, after production of identity cards issued by the Shipping Master at Mumbai, Kolkata, or Chennai;
 Persons holding a Permanent Immigration Visa, such as visas issued by the UK, USA, or Australia;
 Persons possessing a two years' diploma from any institute recognized by the National Council for Vocational Training (NCVT) or the State Council of Vocational Training (SCVT), or persons holding a three years' diploma or equivalent degree from an institution such as a polytechnic recognized by the union or a state government;
 Nurses possessing qualifications recognised under the Indian Nursing Council Act, 1947;
 All persons above the age of 50 years;
 All persons who have been staying abroad for more than three years (whether in one continuous period or in aggregate), as well as their spouses;
 All children up to the age of 18 years.

In accordance with a ruling by the Ministry of External Affairs, passports issued from 2007 onwards do not have the ECNR stamp affixed; instead, a blank page 2 of the passport is deemed to have been ECNR endorsed. As a result, only ECR stamps are now affixed to Indian passports. For passports issued before January 2007, no notation in the passport means ECR. For passports issued in or after January 2007, no notation in the passport means ECNR. If Emigration Check is Required, there will be an endorsement in the passport regarding ECR.

Features
Since 25 November 2015, Indian passports that are handwritten or with an original date of expiry extending to 20 years have not been valid under ICAO travel regulations. With more recent Indian passports the personal particulars of the passport holder, that were hitherto printed on the inner cover page, are printed on the second page of the document. Another added security feature in the newer non-handwritten passports is a ghost picture of the holder found on the right side of the second page. Apart from stymieing criminals from printing fake passports, recent changes also help prevent smudging of the document because of inkjet printers.

Fees
The price for a standard passport in India: 
 1500 – Fresh issuance or reissue of passport (36 pages, standard size) with 10-year validity.
 2000 – Fresh issuance or reissue of passport (60 pages, 'jumbo' size) with 10-year validity.
 3500 – First time applicant or renewal with expedited ('tatkaal') service (36 pages) with 10-year validity.
 4000 – First time applicant or renewal with expedited ('tatkaal') service (60 pages) with 10-year validity.
 1000 – Fresh passport issuance for minors (below 18 years of Age) with 5-year validity or till the minor attains the age of 18, whichever is earlier.
 3000 – Duplicate passport (36 pages) in lieu of lost, damaged or stolen passport.
 3500 – Duplicate passport (60 pages) in lieu of lost, damaged or stolen passport.

Indian passports can also be issued outside India, for which fees varies by country.

Issuance

Passport Seva Kendra

In September 2007, the Indian Union Council of Ministers approved a new passport issuance system under the Passport Seva Project. As per the project, front-end activities of passport issuance, dispatch of passports, online linking with police, and Central Printing Unit for centralised printing of passports will be put in place. The new system is trying to be 'timely, transparent, more accessible and reliable manner' for passport issuance. The applicant has to apply for fresh/reissue of passport through the Passport Seva system at one of the 77 Passport offices known as "Passport Seva Kendra"s operating throughout the country.

Biometric passport

India initiated the first phase of biometric e-passport for Diplomatic passport holders in India and abroad. The new passports have been designed locally by the Central Passport Organisation, the India Security Press and IIT Kanpur. It contains a security chip with all personal data and digital images. In the first phase new passports will have a 64KB chip carrying a photograph of the passport holder and in subsequent phases it will have a fingerprint. The new passport has already been tested with passport readers in the United States and has 4-second response time, while the US Passport has 10-second response time. It need not be carried in a metal jacket for security reasons. It will first need to be skimmed through a reader, after which it would generate an access code which then unlocks the chip for reader access.

In India, the e-passport is under its first phase of deployment and is restricted to Diplomatic passport holders. On 25 June 2008 the Indian Passport Authority issued the e-passport to the then President of India Pratibha Patil. As of 2016, the Government has plans to issue e-passports to all of its citizens. Also the Government has authorized Indian Security Press to float a global three-stage tender for procurement of ICAO-compliant electronic contactless inlays along with its operating system, which is required for the manufacture of Biometric Passports. The necessary procurement have been initiated by India Security Press, Nasik by calling for Global tender for the supply of electronic contactless inlays. The actual transition to the new age passport is expected to commence on the successful completion of the tendering and procurement process. The Biometric E-Passport work is currently in progress/pipeline and is yet to be available for Ordinary Passport holders.

During the 2022 Union budget of India speech, Finance minister Nirmala Sitharaman announced that e-Passports with embedded chip and futuristic technology will be rolled out in 2022-23. It contains microchips that would have important security data stored in them, which enhances the convenience of citizens in their overseas travel. The Ministry of External Affairs has stated that the digital passport will allow greater security for personal data as well as smoother immigration process.

Passport power and visa requirements
Visa requirements for Indian citizens are administrative entry restrictions by the authorities of other states placed on citizens of India.

Passport Power Ranking and visa-free travel

, Henley Passport Index ranks Indian passport at 84th place out of 110 with visa-free or visa on arrival access to 60 nations and territories to Indian citizens. , The Passport Index ranks Indian passport at 72nd place out of 96 on global ranking with 70th mobility ranking (based on visa-free or visa on arrival access to nations or territories). Minister of State for External Affairs V. Muraleedharan in his reply to an unstarred question in Rajya Sabha in November 2019 stated that the rank of the Indian passport on the Henley Passport Index is expected to improve.

Furthermore, Indian citizens may live and work freely in Nepal under the terms of the 1950 Indo-Nepal Treaty of Peace and Friendship.

Foreign travel statistics
According to the statistics these are the numbers of Indian visitors to various countries in 2017 (unless otherwise noted)

Gallery of historic images

See also

 Visa requirements for Indian citizens
 Visa policy of India
 Indian nationality law
 Overseas Citizenship of India
 The Passports Act

References

External links

 

Passports by country
Indian nationality law
Identity documents of India